The 2010 Alexander Keith's Tankard was held February 3-7 at Curling Beauséjour Inc. in Moncton, New Brunswick. The winner represented New Brunswick at the 2010 Tim Hortons Brier in Halifax, Nova Scotia.

Teams

Standings

Results

February 3
Sherrard 7-5 Jones
Perron 9-3 Dobson
Sullivan 9-4 Hansen
Odishaw 8-4 Grattan

February 4
Grattan 10-8 Dobson
Jones 9-8 Sullivan
Odishaw 7-5 Perron
Sherrard 6-5 Hansen
Perron 7-5 Hansen
Sherrard 7-5 Odishaw
Grattan 8-7 Jones (11)
Dobson 7-4 Sullivan
Odishaw 9-5 Sullivan
Grattan 9-6 Hansen
Sherrard 5-4 Dobson (11)
Jones 9-5 Perron

February 5
Jones 6-5 Dobson (11)
Perron 6-4 Sherrard
Grattan 11-4 Sullivan
Odishaw 5-4 Hansen
Perron 4-1 Sullivan
Hansen 6-2 Dobson
Odishaw 7-4 Jones
Grattan 7-2 Sherrard

February 6
Odishaw 7-6 Dobson
Perron 8-3 Gratton
Sherrard 8-2 Sullivan
Jones 8-4 Hansen

Tie-breaker
February 6
Grattan 6-3 Sherrard

Playoffs

Semi-final
February 6

Final
February 7

External links
Results on Curlingzone.com

Alexander Keith's Tankard
Curling competitions in Moncton
2010 in New Brunswick